The 1969–70 NBA season was the Warriors' 24th season in the NBA and 8th in the San Francisco Bay Area.

Offseason

Draft picks

Roster

Regular season

Season standings

Record vs. opponents

Game log

Awards and records
Nate Thurmond, NBA All-Star Game

References

Golden State Warriors seasons
San Francisco
San Fran
San Fran